Shogi, like western chess, can be divided into the opening, middle game and endgame, each requiring a different strategy. The opening consists of arranging one's defenses and positioning for attack, the middle game consists of attempting to break through the opposing defenses while maintaining one's own, and the endgame starts when one side's defenses have been compromised.

Tactics

Many basic tactics (手筋 tesuji) of shogi are similar to those of chess tactics, involving forks, pins, removing the defender and other techniques, all of which are considered very strong when used effectively.

However, other tactics, particularly ones involving dropped pieces, have no parallel in western chess.

Relative piece value

Shogi pieces may be considered to have different valuations in which some pieces are generally more valuable than others – all other things being equal. (Cf. piece value in western chess.)

There are three main valuation groups:

 the king which has an absolute value since the game is lost if mated
 the two major (most mobile) ranging pieces (大駒 oogoma): rook, bishop
 the minor pieces (小駒 kogoma): pawn, lance, knight, silver, gold

The minor pieces can be further grouped in the following valuation hierarchy:

 gold > silver > (knight, lance) > pawn

Sometimes, the relative pieces are formalized with specific numerical values. This is particularly common in the explicit formalizations found in computer shogi. For instance, Reijer Grimbergen uses the following relative values in a Move Merit Analysis formalization:

Grimbergen notes that, unlike western chess, shogi piece valuation is not standardized as different players disagree on the exact values.

Another formalization used by program YSS 7.0 of 1997 had the following relative values:

Kōji Tanigawa, Yasumitsu Satoh (佐藤康光), and Larry Kaufman suggest the following values:

Under two of these valuation schemes, the promoted pawn, lance and knight all have a higher value than a gold even though when promoted they move the same as a gold. The reason for this is that they will return to their lesser values when captured by an opponent whereas a captured gold gives the opponent a relatively more valuable piece.

Kaufman, for example, notes that exchanging a promoted pawn for a real gold is often a good material gain tactic because the player with the promoted pawn loses only two points while his opponent loses seven.

Relative piece valuations are used to roughly evaluate piece exchanges. For example, if there is an opportunity to capture two golds from an opponent by giving up a rook and a pawn, using Kaufman's scheme, this is seem as a favorable trade (all else equal):

 (gold + gold) > (rook + pawn)
 (8 + 8) > (13 + 1)

However, this wouldn't be a good trade if the rook was promoted:

 (gold + gold) < (dragon + pawn)
 (8 + 8) < (17 + 1)

Castles

In shogi, strong defensive fortifications protecting the king are known as castles. There are many types of castles and variations which can be used, but it is essential to understand which ones are useful in the current situation and how to compensate for its weak points. Three commonly used castles are listed below.

The Fortress castle was considered by many to be the strongest defensive position in shogi in the 1980s. Although there are many variants, a common Fortress structure is the Gold Fortress. The Fortress opening, in which both players adopt Fortress castles, has a strongly protected king; a well-fortified line of pawns; and the bishop, rook, and a pawn all support a later attack by the rook's silver or knight. It is notoriously difficult to break down with a frontal assault although it is weaker from the side. It is typically used against Static Rook openings that involve advancing the rook's pawn. However, one's opponent may just as easily adopt this defense, giving neither side an advantage. The Fortress castle can also be used against Bishop-Exchange Ranging Rook opponents, and there is a variant of Fortress built on the right side of the board for use in Double Ranging Rook positions as well.

A defensive position that is considered easier for beginners but still popular with professionals is the Mino castle. The king is placed in a safe position, while the three generals work well to back each other up. This is often used when a player chooses a Ranging Rook opening rather than a Static Rook opening. However, it is also relatively common for Static Rook variant of Mino built on the left side of the board for use against Static Rook or Ranging Rook opponents.

A third common castle often used in professional shogi is the Bear-in-the-hole castle, commonly called the Bear In The Hole castle in English. A player utilizing the Ranging Rook strategy uses a Ranging Rook Bear-in-the-hole on the right side. The result will place the king in the corner square where the lance started, defended by two gold generals and one silver. This way, the king cannot be easily checked by a knight or a ranging piece.

Sabaki
The Japanese noun sabaki (捌き; verb form: 捌く sabaku) is a term of art used in shogi. The term has been borrowed into English instead of being translated.

Its meaning is context-dependent.

In the opening, sabaki usually simply means good piece development in preparation for the middle game.

However, in the middle game, it has a more nuanced meaning of developing pieces – especially major pieces (rook and bishop) – in ways such that they become fully activated with their attacking lines cleared for offensive purposes. In a shogi opening, piece development will often result in pieces being clustered together in cramped configurations. To achieve sabaki is to change the configuration by clearing off certain obstructing pieces via piece exchanges so that attacking pieces are dominant on the board with newly obtained freedom of movement. With respect to the major pieces, this is typically done by clearing off the bishop's diagonals and the rook's ranks and files. Although the term is associated with freeing pieces in cramped positions, it does not mean escaping from the cramped position in a successful defense. Rather the term refers to development for attacking.

The term sabaki as used in go has a very different meaning.

In western chess, a similar concept is sometimes referred to as a freeing move or maneuver (such as a pawn break). However, in shogi, the concept of sabaki often involves multiple moves and multiple pieces. (Cf. chess terms break and blocked position.)

Sabaki example 1

For a basic example, in the adjacent diagrams, the rook positioned on the central file (as in Central Rook openings) is blocked by pawns and its potential movement is restricted by both players' silvers. In order to achieve sabaki, an attack is started on the central file with 1. P-55.  White takes the pawn with subsequent captures by both silvers (1...Px55, 2. Sx55 Sx55, 3. Rx55). After the final capture of White's silver by Black's rook, the rook now has clear paths of attack (the entire middle rank and central file) including access to the promotion zone of White where the rook can promote into a dragon. Note that the central pawns and silvers were simply traded off the board and put in hand, there was no material gain or loss from this exchange in this simple example. Other examples may involve piece sacrifices in order to achieve sabaki.

Opening

The opening of shogi is generally slower than that of chess, due to the larger board and less mobile pieces. But since a quick offense will leave a player's home territory open to drop attacks as soon as pieces are exchanged, the aim of the opening is to build up defenses for the king, typically by moving the king to the side in a castle with three generals. Leaving a king on its original square (居玉 igyoku or "sitting king") may be a particularly dangerous position.

Both players can move the rook pawn forward (P-26), or, more commonly, advance the pawn above and to the right of the bishop (P-76). The former is known as a rook opening and the latter a bishop opening.

With a bishop opening, it is common to trade bishops by having one capture the other. This allows each player to put their newly captured bishop into play anywhere on the board, although care must be taken to avoid weaknesses in defense which may allow for a bishop drop. However, it is not advantageous to trade bishops if your opponent has a better defensive setup, or more lines of attack. Moreover, making a bishop trade constitutes tempo loss, so it is not advised without a good reason.

Many common opening attacks involve advancing a silver and ideally pawns, protected by other pieces. Because silvers have more possibilities for retreat, while golds better defend their sides, silvers are generally considered superior as attacking pieces, and golds superior as defensive pieces. It is common practice to defend the king with three generals, two golds and a silver.

Because defense is so important, and because shogi pieces are relatively slow movers, the opening game tends to be much longer in shogi than in international chess, commonly with a dozen or more moves to shore up defenses before the initial attack is made.

Over many decades, Japanese professional players have all invented various jōseki, which determine moves and sequences which are thought to be the best for a particular situation. It also covers a branch of different variations within an intricate strategy, including alternative options and the certain consequences that some moves may bring.

Openings are also classified as Static Rook openings, where the offense is supported by the rook in its original position, and Ranging Rook openings, where the rook moves to the center or left of the board to support an attack there, typically with the idea of allowing the opponent to attack while arranging a better defense and aiming for a counterattack. However, as the most powerful piece on the board, the rook invites attack, and in most cases, especially for weaker players, it is a good idea to keep the king well away from the rook. Relatedly, the Static vs Ranging Rook classification corresponds to castle development: Static Rook positions tend to have castles on the left side of the board while Ranging Rook positions tend to have castles on the right side.

Middle game
Professional shogi players tend to evaluate the flow of the game, that is, the sequence of moves leading to the current position and its likely development, much more than chess players.

Because pawns attack head on, and cannot defend each other, they tend to be lost early in the game, providing ammunition for such attacks. Dropping a pawn behind enemy lines, promoting it to a tokin (gold general), and dropping a second pawn immediately behind the tokin so that they protect each other makes a strong attack; it threatens the opponent's entire defense, but provides little value to the opponent if the attack fails and the pieces are captured.

Players raised on international chess often make poor use of drops, but dropping is half the game. If a player has more than a couple of captured pieces in hand, it is likely that dropping attacks are being overlooked. However, it is wise to keep a pawn in hand, and often to exchange pieces if necessary to get one.  Compared with international chess players, shogi players are more likely to sacrifice pieces, even powerful ones, if the resulting capture can be dropped back into play for a specific purpose.

Attacking pieces can easily become trapped behind enemy lines, as the opponent can often drop a pawn on a protected square to cut off the line of retreat. For this reason, rooks, which can retreat in only one direction, are commonly kept at a safe distance in the early parts of the game, and used to support attacks by weaker pieces. However, once the game has opened up, a promoted rook is an especially deadly piece behind enemy lines.

Advancing a lance pawn can open up the side of the board for attack. Therefore, when a player first advances a lance pawn, it is common, though not obligatory, for the opponent to answer by advancing the opposing pawn, in order to avoid complications later in the game.  It also allows the king to escape if attacked from the side.

Endgame
The collapse of one side's defense marks the beginning of the endgame. Once a player has broken through the enemy lines, the opponent's king can be easily trapped by its own pieces. A common last-ditch defensive tactic is to open the pawn line to allow the king to escape.  Kings are more difficult to checkmate in the open, especially if the opponent does not have many ranging pieces (rook, bishop, lance) in play.

In the endgame, it comes down to a race over who can checkmate the opponent first. A technique known as speed counting plays an important role in the endgame. By counting the number of moves until checkmate (assuming the opponent doesn't get to move) for both Black and White, this will help to influence decisions on whether to attack or defend. A simple mistake can change the flow of the game drastically. Among this, there are many other delicate factors to look out for within the endgame, including sacrificial attacks and traps.

A player's endgame play is strengthened by training on tsume shogi and brinkmate problems.

See also

 Shogi opening
 Castle (shogi)
 Shogi tactics
 Tsume shogi
 Brinkmate

Notes

References

Bibliography

 
 
 
 
 
 : Many shogi games (professional, online, AI) put into a decision tree structure with user-generated commentary and references and some opening classifications.

Further reading

External links
 Shogi Openings · strategy blog by 6-dan professional, Akira Nishio
 ShogiBase for Shogi Lovers · amateur games with commentary by professional players
 How to Defend in Shogi · partial translation of 将棋の受け方 shōgi no ukekata by Yasuharu Ōyama.
 Lightning Speed Endgame Technique · Translation of 光速の終盤術 kōsoku no shūbanjutsu by Lifetime Meijin, Koji Tanigawa.
 Shogi Shack
 Reijer Grimbergen's Shogi professional game records with comments 1997–2013
 Tiny Dictionary of Shogi Proverbs · Translation of 将棋格言豆事典 Shougi Kakugen Mame Jiten by 浦野真彦 Masahiko Urano
 Ricoh Shogi Club
 HIDETCHI's YouTube videos:
 How To Play Shogi (将棋): Lesson 14: Opening Principles
 Shogi Exercises · Playlist of various tactics, attack strategies, and mate problems

Shogi theory